

The Batak languages are a subgroup of the Austronesian languages spoken by the Batak people in the Indonesian province of North Sumatra and surrounding areas.

Internal classification

The Batak languages can be divided into two main branches, Northern Batak and Southern Batak. Simalungun was long considered an intermediary, but in current classifications it is recognized as part of the Southern branch.  Within Northern Batak, a study noted 76% cognate words between Karo and Alas, 81% with Pakpak, 80% with Simalungun, and 30% with Malay (Indonesian). Karo and Toba Batak are mutually unintelligible.

Mandailing and Angkola are closer related to each other than to Toba. The geographical influences on the Batak languages can be seen in the map in the infobox; Lake Toba separates the Karo from direct contact with the Toba.

Reconstruction 

The Batak languages can be shown to descend from a hypothetical common ancestor, Proto-Batak (which in turn originates from Proto-Austronesian). The sound system of Proto-Batak was reconstructed by Adelaar (1981).

Final diphthongs: *-uy, *-ey, *-ow.

The Proto-Batak sounds underwent the following changes in the individual daughter languages:

 Proto-Batak *k became h in initial and medial position in the Southern Batak languages:
 Proto-Batak  > Toba, Simalungun ; Karo  'person'
 Proto-Batak > Toba, Simalungun ; Karo  'grass'

 Proto-Batak *h was lost in Toba, Angkola and Mandailing:
 Proto-Batak  > Toba , Simalungun , Karo  /pərəh/ 'wring out'

 Proto-Batak final voiced stops *b, *d, and *g are retained only in Simalungun. In Toba, Angkola and Mandailing, they are unvoiced, while in the Northern Batak languages, they changed to homorganic nasals (/m/, /n/, /ŋ/):
 Proto-Batak  > Simalungun , Toba , Karo  /dələŋ/ 'mountain'.

 The central vowel *ə is retained in the Northern languages, and shifted to /o/ in the Southern languages:
Proto-Batak  > Karo  (/ənəm/), Toba  'six'

 Proto-Batak diphthongs are only retained in Simalungun, but shifted to monophthongs in all other Batak languages:
Proto-Batak  > Simalungun ; all other languages  'fire'
Proto-Batak  > Simalungun ; all other languages  'dead'
Proto-Batak  > Simalungun ; all other languages  'island'

Writing system 

Historically, the Batak languages were written using the Batak script, but the Latin script is now used for most writing.

References

External links 

 http://unicode-table.com/en/sections/batak/
 Batak languages at Ethnologue (22nd ed., 2019).

 
Northwest Sumatra–Barrier Islands languages
Languages of Indonesia